Navia octopoides is a plant species in the genus Navia. This species is endemic to Venezuela.

References

octopoides
Flora of Venezuela